2015 Borno bombing may refer to:

January 2015 Maiduguri suicide bombing
March 2015 Maiduguri suicide bombing
June 2015 Monguno bombing
August 2015 Borno bombing
September 2015 Borno State bombings
October 2015 Maiduguri and Yola bombings
December 2015 Madagali and Maiduguri bombings